WFWA - is a PBS member television station (channel 39) in Fort Wayne, Indiana, United States. Owned by Fort Wayne Public Television, Inc.

WFWA may also refer to:
 Welsh Football Writers Association - Association of Welsh football journalists.
 Women Friendly Workplace Awards - Sri Lanka's first-ever gender equality accolade.
 West Four Wrestling Alliance - Original name of professional wrestling promotion International Wrestling Alliance, based in the Manitoba, Canada
 WFWA Canadian Heavyweight Championship - Manitoba based wrestling title in the IWA